Lithopoma phoebium, common name the longspine star shell, is a species of medium-sized sea snail, a marine gastropod mollusk in the family Turbinidae, the turban snails.

Distribution 
This is a tropical Western Atlantic species.

Distribution of Lithopoma phoebium include:  Aruba, Belize, Bonaire, Caribbean Sea, Cayman Islands, Colombia, Costa Rica, Cuba, Curaçao, Gulf of Mexico, Jamaica, Lesser Antilles, Mexico, Panama, Puerto Rico, San Andres, The United States, and Venezuela.

Description 
The maximum recorded shell length is 76 mm (almost 3 inches).

Habitat 
The minimum recorded depth for this species is 0 m; maximum recorded depth is 91 m.

References

 Turgeon, D.D., et al. 1998. Common and scientific names of aquatic invertebrates of the United States and Canada. American Fisheries Society Special Publication 26 page(s): 59
 Williams, S.T. (2007). Origins and diversification of Indo-West Pacific marine fauna: evolutionary history and biogeography of turban shells (Gastropoda, Turbinidae). Biological Journal of the Linnean Society, 2007, 92, 573–592.
 Rosenberg, G., F. Moretzsohn, and E. F. García. 2009. Gastropoda (Mollusca) of the Gulf of Mexico, Pp. 579–699 in Felder, D.L. and D.K. Camp (eds.), Gulf of Mexico–Origins, Waters, and Biota. Biodiversity. Texas A&M Press, College Station, Texas
 Alf A. & Kreipl K. (2011) The family Turbinidae. Subfamilies Turbininae Rafinesque, 1815 and Prisogasterinae Hickman & McLean, 1990. In: G.T. Poppe & K. Groh (eds), A Conchological Iconography. Hackenheim: Conchbooks. pp. 1–82, pls 104-245.

External links 

 

phoebium
Gastropods described in 1798